= Rudolph J. Wig =

American industrialist (1883–1968)

Rudolph James Wig (October 3, 1883 – April 8, 1968) was an American industrialist, trustee of Pomona College, and layman of the Presbyterian Church. He was an associate engineer and physicist at the Government Bureau of Standards and published scientific papers about handling and testing of concrete construction.
